Thomazeau is a commune in the Croix-des-Bouquets Arrondissement, Ouest department of Haiti. It has 52,017 inhabitants.

References

Populated places in Ouest (department)
Communes of Haiti